Innico d'Avalos d'Aragona (1535/36–1600) was an Italian Cardinal, from Naples.

In 1563, he constructed the Castello d'Avalos on Procida, a small island in the Gulf of Naples.

After a period as lay administrator (he was for a while Chancellor of the Kingdom of Naples, he was made bishop of Mileto in 1566, bishop of Sabina in 1586, bishop of Frascati in 1589, bishop of Porto e Santa Rufina in 1591.

In Spain, another clergyman member of this family was cardinal Gaspar Dávalos de la Cueva.

Episcopal succession

References

External links

1530s births
1600 deaths
Chancellors of Naples
16th-century Italian cardinals
Cardinal-bishops of Frascati
Cardinal-bishops of Porto
Cardinal-bishops of Sabina
16th-century Neapolitan people
Innico
16th-century Italian Roman Catholic bishops